María Inés Espínola Lorenzo (born 11 December 1974) is an Argentine windsurfer. She competed in the women's Lechner A-390 event at the 1992 Summer Olympics.

Notes

References

External links
 

1974 births
Living people
Argentine female sailors (sport)
Argentine windsurfers
Olympic sailors of Argentina
Sailors at the 1992 Summer Olympics – Lechner A-390
Place of birth missing (living people)
Female windsurfers